The Treaty of Alfred and Guthrum is a 9th-century peace agreement between Alfred of Wessex and Guthrum, the Viking ruler of East Anglia. It sets out the boundaries between Alfred and Guthrum's territories as well as agreements on peaceful trade, and the weregild value of its people.

Background
In 866, the Great Heathen Army landed in East Anglia with the intention of conquering  all of the English kingdoms. During its campaign, the Viking army conquered the kingdoms of East Anglia, Mercia, and Northumbria. It initially  overran the Kingdom of Wessex, but Danish King Guthrum was defeated by Alfred's army at the Battle of Edington in 878. Under the terms of his surrender, shortly afterward, Guthrum was obliged to be baptised to endorse the agreement, as well as to allow him to rule more legitimately over his Christian vassals but remaining pagan to his pagan vassals. He was then with his army to leave Wessex. That agreement is known as the Treaty of Wedmore.  

Sometime after Wedmore, a treaty was agreed that set out the lasting peace terms between the two kings, which is known as the Treaty of Alfred and Guthrum. The treaty is one of the few existing documents of Alfred's reign and survives in Old English in Corpus Christi College, Cambridge, Manuscript 383, and in a Latin compilation, known as Quadripartitus.

The year that the treaty was created is not known for sure but is believed to have been between  878 and Guthrum's death in 890.

The prologue to the treaty was a legitimisation of the territory that was held by both parties: Guthrum's landholdings in East Anglia and Alfred's in Mercia. Clauses 2 and 3 specify the blood money (or weregild), that is the value of men based on their status. The other clauses are concerned with the purchase of men, horses and oxen. There is also provision for hostages as a guarantee of good faith for one side trading with the other.

Terms

There is more than one version of the treaty recorded. The original documents were written in Old English. This version was translated by Frederick Attenborough

See also
Treaty of Wedmore
List of treaties

Notes

Citations

Bibliography

 
 

 
 
 
 

Anglo-Norse England
Alfred and Guthrum
870s
880s
9th century in England
9th-century treaties
Alfred the Great
East Anglian monarchs